Manjargaon is a village in the Karmala taluka of Solapur district in Maharashtra state, India.

Demographics
Covering  and comprising 272 households at the time of the 2011 census of India, Manjargaon had a population of 1333. There were 722 males and 611 females, with 162 people being aged six or younger.

References

Villages in Karmala taluka